The 1968 Western Australian state election was held on 23 March 1968.

Retiring Members

Labor

 James Hegney MLA (Belmont)
 Albert Hawke MLA (Northam)
 Bill Hegney MLA (Mount Hawthorn)
 Lionel Kelly MLA (Merredin-Yilgarn)
 Harry May MLA (Collie)
 Joseph Rowberry MLA (Warren)
 Henry Curran MLA (Cockburn)

LCL

 Les Nimmo MLA (Karrinyup)
 Bill Crommelin MLA (Claremont)
 Keith Watson MLC (Metropolitan)

Legislative Assembly
Sitting members are shown in bold text. Successful candidates are highlighted in the relevant colour. Where there is possible confusion, an asterisk (*) is also used.

Legislative Council
Sitting members are shown in bold text. Successful candidates are highlighted in the relevant colour. Where there is possible confusion, an asterisk (*) is also used.

See also
 Members of the Western Australian Legislative Assembly, 1965–1968
 Members of the Western Australian Legislative Assembly, 1968–1971
 Members of the Western Australian Legislative Council, 1965–1968
 Members of the Western Australian Legislative Council, 1968–1971
 1968 Western Australian state election

References
 

Candidates for Western Australian state elections